This is a list of books in the VeggieTales franchise.

Stories

Comics

SuperComics

Volume 1

 Dave and the Giant Pickle
 Lyle the Kindly Viking
 LarryBoy and the Prideasaurus

Volume 2

 The League of Incredible Vegetables
 LarryBoy and the Reckless Ruckus
 Josh and the Big Wall

Volume 3

 Rack, Shack, and Benny
 MacLarry and the Stinky Cheese Battle
 LarryBoy and the Rude Beet

Volume 4

 Minnesota Cuke and the Search for Samson's Hairbrush
 LarryBoy and the Quitter Critter Quad Squad
 Where's God When I'm S-Scared?

Volume 5

 Tomato Sawyer and Huckleberry Larry's Big River Rescue
King George and the Ducky
LarryBoy and the Merciless Mango

Volume 6 

 The Ballad of Little Joe
Veggies in Space: The Fennel Frontier
LarryBoy and the Foolish Fig from Faraway

References 

VeggieTales